Gilgamesh was a legendary king of Uruk.

Gilgamesh may also refer to:
 Epic of Gilgamesh, a poem about a legendary king of Uruk

Fictional characters
 Gilgamesh, the protagonist of the Babylonian Castle Saga video game franchise
 Gilgamesh (Final Fantasy), a character in the Final Fantasy video game series
 Gilgamesh (Fate/stay night), a character in the Fate franchise
 Gilgamesh (Marvel Comics) or Forgotten One, an Eternal in the Marvel Comics universe

Literature
 Gilgamesh (novel), a 2001 novel by Joan London
 Gilgamesh (manga) a manga and anime by Shotaro Ishinomori
 Gilgamesh the King, 1984 historical novel by Robert Silverberg

Music
 Gilgamesh (band), a jazz fusion band in the 1970s
 Gilgamesh (Martinů) or The Epic of Gilgamesh, a 1955 choral work by Bohuslav Martinů

Operas
 Gilgamesh (Kodallı opera) (1962–1964)
 Gilgamesh (Saygun opera) (1964–1970)
 Gilgamesh (Nørgård opera) (1971–72)
 Gilgamesh (Brucci opera) (1986)
 Gilgamesh, a 1992 opera by Franco Battiato

Albums
 Gilgamesh (Acrassicauda album) (2015)
 Gilgamesh (Gilgamesh album) (1975)
 Gilgamesh, a 2010 album by Gypsy & The Cat

Other uses
Gilgamesh (restaurant), a restaurant in London
 Gilgamesh, a crater on Ganymede
 1812 Gilgamesh, an small asteroid

See also
 Epic of Gilgamesh (disambiguation)
 Gilgamesh flood myth
 Gilgamesh in the arts and popular culture
Gilgamesh II, a miniseries published by DC Comics
 Gilgamesh Night, a softcore porn Japanese variety TV show broadcast from 1991 to 1998
 Gilgamesh Wulfenbach, a character in Girl Genius
 Girugamesh, a Japanese rock/metal band